Šimanovci is a village in Serbia. It is situated in the Pećinci municipality, in the Srem District, Vojvodina province. The village has a Serb ethnic majority and its population numbering 3,358 people (2002 census).

External links
 "simanovci.rs" Portal of Šimanovci

See also
List of places in Serbia
List of cities, towns and villages in Vojvodina

Populated places in Syrmia